Infernal Affairs is a 2002 Hong Kong action thriller film co-directed by Andrew Lau and Alan Mak. Jointly written by Mak and Felix Chong, it stars Andy Lau, Tony Leung, Anthony Wong, Eric Tsang, Sammi Cheng and Kelly Chen. The film follows an undercover Hong Kong Police Force officer who infiltrates a Triad, and another officer who is secretly a spy for the same Triad. It is the first in the Infernal Affairs series and is followed by Infernal Affairs II and Infernal Affairs III.

The film was selected as the Hong Kong entry for the Best Foreign Language Film at the 76th Academy Awards but was not nominated. Miramax Films acquired the United States distribution rights and gave it a limited US theatrical release in 2004. Martin Scorsese remade the film in 2006 as The Departed, which won the Academy Award for Best Picture as well as Academy Award for Best Director, Scorsese’s first and only Oscar in his career, and Best Adapted Screenplay. In 2017,  an Indian remake of the film was also planned.

A 4K remaster of the Infernal Affairs trilogy was released on 12 December 2022, to celebrate the 20th anniversary of Infernal Affairs.

Plot 
Hon Sam, a Triad boss, sends Lau Kin-ming, a young gangster, to the police academy to serve as his spy in the Hong Kong Police Force. Around the same time, Chan Wing-Yan, a young police cadet, is seemingly expelled from the police academy. In reality, Chan has secretly become an undercover cop reporting only to Superintendent Wong Chi-shing, who sends him to infiltrate Hon's triad. Over the course of ten years, Chan experiences great stress from his undercover work while Lau quickly rises through the ranks in the police force, eventually becoming a Senior Inspector. Wong and his team interrupt a deal between Hon and a Thai cocaine dealer after receiving a tip-off from Chan. However, Lau alerts Hon, giving him enough time to get his henchmen to dispose of the evidence.

After this incident, both Wong and Hon realise that they have a spy within their own organisation, placing them in a race against time to find out who the spy is. Chan nearly finds out Lau's identity when he tries to follow Lau after seeing him talking to Hon in a cinema; Lau manages to get away before Chan could see his face. By this time, both Chan and Lau are struggling with their double identities – Chan starts losing faith in himself as a cop after being a gangster for ten years; Lau becomes more accustomed to the life of a police officer and wants to end his association with the triad. At their next meeting on a rooftop, Wong wants to pull Chan out of undercover work for fear of his safety.

However, Hon, who knows about the meeting from Lau, sends "Crazy" Keung and other henchmen to confront them. Chan escapes from the building while Wong tries to distract the gangsters and ends up being thrown off the roof to his death. Just then, the police show up and a shootout ensues. Keung, not knowing that Chan is the mole, drives them away from the scene but dies from a gunshot wound later. When the news report that Keung is actually an undercover cop, Hon assumes that he was the spy and that Chan killed him to protect himself. Lau retrieves Wong's cell phone and contacts Chan; both of them agree to foil a drug deal by Hon. The plan succeeds and many of Hon's men are arrested, while Lau betrays and kills Hon.

Everything seems to have returned to normal – Chan can revert to his true identity as a cop, while Lau has erased his criminal connections by eliminating the triad. However, back at the police headquarters, Chan discovers that Lau was the spy and leaves immediately. Realising what has happened, Lau erases Chan's file from the police database and makes a copy on his personal computer, intending to use the proof of Chan's identity as leverage, so that he would not reveal his real identity. Chan sends to Lau a compact disc with a recording that Hon kept between himself and Lau. The disc inadvertently ends up in the hands of Lau's girlfriend, Mary. Chan and Lau meet on the same rooftop where Wong was killed earlier. Chan disarms Lau and holds his pistol to Lau's head; Lau states calmly that he "wants to be a good person" now, but Chan rejects Lau's plea to help him conceal his criminal past.

Inspector "Big B" arrives on the scene shortly and orders Chan to release Lau. Chan holds Lau as a hostage at gunpoint and backs into an elevator, but gets shot in the head by "Big B" when he moves his head from behind Lau. "Big B" then reveals to Lau that he is also a spy planted by Hon in the police force, and assures Lau that he has destroyed evidence of Lau's criminal associations. When they take the elevator to the ground floor, Lau kills "Big B". Lee discovers records that prove Chan's identity as an undercover cop, while "Big B" is identified as the spy in the police force and the case is closed. Lau salutes Chan at his funeral, with Cheung and Lee present as well. A flashback reaffirms the point that Lau wished he had taken a different route in life.

Cast
 Andy Lau as Senior Inspector Lau Kin-ming (劉健明), Hon's spy in the police force.
 Edison Chen as young Lau Kin-ming
 Tony Leung as Chan Wing-yan (陳永仁), an undercover cop in Hon's triad.
 Shawn Yue as young Chan Wing-yan
 Anthony Wong as Superintendent Wong Chi-shing (黃志誠), Chan's superior.
 Eric Tsang as Hon Sam (韓琛), the triad boss and main antagonist.
 Chapman To as "Silly" Keung (傻強), Hon's henchman.
 Gordon Lam as Inspector B (大B; Big B), Lau's subordinate who is also a mole in the police force.
 Sammi Cheng as Mary, Lau's fiancée.
 Kelly Chen as Lee Sum-yee (李心兒), Chan's psychiatrist.
 Berg Ng as Senior Inspector Cheung (張Sir), Wong's subordinate.
 Wan Chi-keung as Officer Leung (梁Sir), the chief superintendent of the internal affairs department.
 Dion Lam as Del Piero (迪路), Hon's henchman.
 Elva Hsiao as May, Chan's ex-girlfriend.
 Hui Kam-fung as Officer Yip (葉Sir), Chan's cadet school principal

Alternate ending
An alternate ending for the film was shot in order to comply with Article 25 (7) of the Chinese Film Administration Regulations specifying that films cannot propagate obscenity, gambling or violence, or abet to commit crimes. In the original (Hong Kong) ending, Lau concealed his true identity as a Triad spy and identified himself as a police officer to avoid legislative punishment. Therefore, the original ending version promotes criminal activity and injustice, and an alternate ending was filmed in order to access the market of mainland China. In the alternate ending, inspector Cheung discovered evidence of Lau’s criminal activity and immediately arrested Lau outside the elevator. This alternate ending was shown in mainland China and Malaysia.

Analysis

Postcolonial identity crisis in Hong Kong
In Infernal Affairs, the identity crisis suffered by both Chan and Lau as a mole is hinting at the schizophrenic struggle of Hong Kong residents, who faced both the colonization by the British and the reunification with Mainland China. Specifically, under Deng Xiaoping’s "One Country, Two System policy", the duplicity, unsettling, and uncertain nature of the future of Hong Kong residents is tightly echoed in Chan and Lau’s character developments. Scholar Howard Y. F. Choy further claimed that “this postcolonial (re)turn is actually more a recolonization than a decolonization of the capitalist Cantonese city by the mainland Mandarin master.”

Quotes from Buddha
Infernal Affairs opens with Buddhist classic Nirvana Sutra Verse Nineteen, stating that “The worst of the Eight Hells is called Continuous Hell. It has the meaning of Continuous Suffering. Thus the name.” The film also closes with another quote from Buddha, stating that “He who is in Continuous Hell never dies. Longevity is a big hardship in Continuous Hell.” In Buddhism, Continuous Hell is also termed The Avici, where one can never reincarnate nor be relieved from guilt and suffering. This concept of timeless, placeless, and endless suffering especially applies to the character Lau throughout the trilogy, who infinitely bears the burden of self-betrayal (serves as a mole), loss of family and friendship, and unsettledness.

Reception

Box office
Upon its premiere in Hong Kong, Infernal Affairs grossed $160,356 during the opening day (January 16–19). In total, the film grossed $7,035,649 during its run in Hong Kong theatres. The film was then released across Asia, where it grossed a further $169,659 from theatre receipts. In 2016, South Korean theaters re-released the film, which went on to gross $128,026 across three weeks. The total lifetime gross of the film in Korea is $977,903.

In total, worldwide, the film grossed $8,836,958 across release in both domestic markets and European theatres which displayed the film.

Critical response
On Rotten Tomatoes, Infernal Affairs has an approval rating of 94% based on reviews from 64 critics, with an average rating of 7.50/10. The consensus from the site reads as "Smart and engrossing, this is one of Hong Kong's better cop thrillers." On Metacritic, the film has a score of 75 out of 100 based on reviews from 19 critics, indicating "generally favorable reviews". It was ranked as the 62nd Best Movie of 2004, 86th Most Discussed Movie of 2004, and the 95th Most Shared Movie of 2004.

Film critic Roger Ebert gave the film a three-out-of-four star rating and described Infernal Affairs as offering "rare emotional depth." In his words, "The movie pays off in a kind of emotional complexity rarely seen in crime movies. I cannot reveal what happens but will urge you to consider the thoughts of two men who finally confront their own real identities—in the person of the other character." New York Times reviewer Elvis Mitchell was so enraptured with the film that he stated that "Infernal Affairs is so beautifully shot that the images occasionally distract you from the condensed policier plot."

Accolades
Infernal Affairs played an integral role in Andrew Lau's breakout films in entering the 21st century. Being the most critically acclaimed film of his to date, it was ranked No. 30 in Empire Magazine's "The 100 Best Films of World Cinema" in 2010.

Infernal Affairs gained significant traction during its festival run as it was nominated for sixteen awards during the 22nd Hong Kong Film Awards, winning seven of those categories. It also won the Best Picture at the 40th Golden Horse Awards, the 8th Golden Bauhinia Awards, and the Best Foreign Language Film at the 46th Blue Ribbon Awards.

Eventually, Infernal Affairs would spark the creation of two more films. With Infernal Affairs II getting 11 nominations and Infernal Affairs III getting 7 nominations during the 23rd Hong Kong Film Awards, with Infernal Affairs II winning Best Original Film Song.

Awards and nominations

Music
The original film score for Infernal Affairs was written and performed by Chan Kwong-wing.

The theme song, Infernal Affairs (無間道), was composed by Ronald Ng, lyrics provided by Albert Leung, and performed in Cantonese and Mandarin by Andy Lau and Tony Leung.

Although not included in the soundtrack, Tsai Chin's (蔡琴) song "Forgotten Times" (《被遺忘的時光》) features prominently in this film as a recurring element of its storyline, and also in its sequels.

Development

Script
Writer Alan Mak has long wanted to write a story about police and gangsters. The script of Infernal Affairs was inspired by John Woo's Face/Off (1997) but Mak knew that faces cannot swap in the real world. Instead, he focuses on the exchange of identity and psychology between the two leads and delves into human nature and the human heart. In the process of Mak's creation, his good friend Felix Chong also encouraged and supported him. The script, written by Mak and revised by Chong, took three years to complete.

The dialogue in the famous rooftop showdown was created on the spot by Felix Chong and Tony Leung, with Chong playing Andy Lau's part. The script originally included a typical shootout in the third act, but Leung insisted on turning it into a dialogue scene.

Gordon Lam did not receive the full script and did not know his character was also a triad mole until the final scene.

Investment
The script for Infernal Affairs originally belonged to Andy Lau's Teamwork Motion Pictures, but entangled amidst a lawsuit, the company was unable to produce the film. In addition, the creative team could not find investors because other studios at the time thought that an undercover film wasn't novel enough to make money. Eventually, Andrew Lau made a hopeless bid and showed the script to John Chong at Media Asia Entertainment Group. To his surprise Chong and company chairman Peter Lam saw potential in the story. Lam proceeded to invest HK $20 million in the film, under the condition that Andy Lau will star the film.

Adaptations
With star power, visual allure, and an engaging script, Andrew Lau and Alan Mak’s Infernal Affairs /《無間道》(2002) did very well critically and financially, spawned two sequels and a television series, and attracted the attention of Hollywood.
In 2003, Brad Pitt's production company Plan B Entertainment acquired the rights for a Hollywood remake, named The Departed, which was directed by Martin Scorsese, and starred Leonardo DiCaprio, Matt Damon, Jack Nicholson, and Mark Wahlberg, set in Boston, Massachusetts, roughly based on the life of famed Boston mobster James "Whitey" Bulger. The Departed was released on 6 October 2006 and won the Academy Award for Best Picture. Andrew Lau, the co-director of Infernal Affairs, who was interviewed by Hong Kong newspaper Apple Daily, said: "Of course I think the version I made is better, but the Hollywood version is pretty good too. [Scorsese] made the Hollywood version more attuned to American culture." Andy Lau, one of the main actors in Infernal Affairs, when asked how the movie compares to the original, said: "The Departed was too long and it felt as if Hollywood had combined all three Infernal Affairs movies together." Lau pointed out that the remake featured some of the "golden quotes" of the original but did have much more swearing. He ultimately rated The Departed 8/10 and said that the Hollywood remake is worth a view, though according to Lau's spokeswoman Alice Tam, he felt that the combination of the two female characters into one in The Departed was not as good as the original storyline.

Lau, Tsang, and Jacky Cheung parodied the cinema scene to promote the Hong Kong Film Awards. Lau and Tsang, in their respective characters, go through the scene where they meet to gather info on the undercover cop amongst Hon Sam's gang. Lau Kin-ming asks Hon, "Why do we always meet in a cinema?", to which Hon answers, "It's quiet. No one comes to movies". Cheung comes out from the shadows behind them and says, "I don't know...quite a few people watch movies" and we see a slew of Hong Kong celebrities watching various clips of Hong Kong films on the screen. Originally Tony Leung was going to appear but scheduling conflicts led to the recasting.

The 2003 TVB spoof celebrating the Chinese New Year called Mo Ba To (吐氣羊眉賀新春之無霸道), the 2004 comedy film Love Is a Many Stupid Thing by Wong Jing, and the 2004 TVB television drama Shades of Truth were re-writings based on the plot of the film.

In Taiwan SHODA (劉裕銘) and a secondary school student Blanka (布蘭卡) cut and rearranged the original film and inserted new sound tracks to produce their videos Infernal Affairs CD pro2 and Infernal Affairs iPod on the web. The videos had many views and both producers removed their videos after receiving cease and desist letters from the Group Power Workshop Limited (群體工作室), the Taiwan distributor of the film.

Media Asia released a limited edition of eight-DVD set of the Infernal Affairs trilogy in an Ultimate Collectible Boxset (無間道終極珍藏DVD系列(8DVD套裝)) on 20 December 2004. Features included an online game and two Chinese fictional novels of the film series by Lee Muk-Tung (李牧童), titled 無間道I+II小說 and 無間道III終極無間小說.

The hi-fi shop scene was later recreated with additions of excerpts of the film to encourage businesses to join the Quality Tourism Services Scheme in Hong Kong.

In 2009, a Korean remake City of Damnation, which was directed by Kim Dong-won was released on 22 January 2009. In 2009, a Telugu remake Homam, which directed and acted by JD Chakravarthy along with Jagapathi Babu was released and became a notable movie. In 2012, Double Face (ダブルフェイス), a Japanese television remake starring Hidetoshi Nishijima was released by TBS and WOWOW. The production aired in two parts: "Police Impersonation" on WOWOW and "Undercover" on TBS.

A TV series remake debuted in 2018 produced by Media Asia and former TVB producer Tommy Leung. The series, which is titled Infernal Affairs like the film, stars Gallen Lo, Damian Lau, Paul Chun, Lo Hoi-pang, Eric Tsang, Derek Kok, Dominic Lam, Toby Leung and Yuen Biao. The story takes place years after the films' events, with some minor characters reprising their roles alongside a new cast. The TV series uses the same concept as the film, but with an entirely new story and characters, and the setting expanded beyond Hong Kong to include Thailand and Shenzhen. It stretched through three seasons with each season consisting of 12 episodes.

Hindi remake is going to be a joint development between Warner Bros. India and Mumbai – based banner Azure and is set for a remake for a two-picture deal

The success of the film inspired many genres, including an open-world video game from United Front Games titled Sleeping Dogs (or True Crime: Hong Kong before canceled by Activision Blizzard in 2011), with the protagonist of the story infiltrating the criminal underworld as an undercover police.

Influence and artistry

The Influence of Infernal Affairs on Hong Kong Cinema
Infernal Affairs is the turning point of Hong Kong film aesthetics. Before Infernal Affairs, there were few serious and artistic works in Hong Kong films, but they basically had the following characteristics:
1. The relative roughness of the production was compensated for by the skill of the practitioners
2. Hong Kong films incorporate a lot of dramatic elements.
After the release of Infernal Affairs, Hong Kong films began to pay attention to the plot and picture.

The Artistry of the Infernal Affairs title
"Insanity" refers to the Insanity Hell, and in the Buddhist view, those who enter the Insanity Hell are extremely sinful. Those who enter the Infinite Hell never have any hope of relief, and they have no other feeling out of suffering. Those who enter the Infinite Hell will forever be tortured in Hell as retribution for the wickedness of their previous lives. The title perfectly sums up the plot described in Infernal Affairs. Two identities should not belong to their own people, as they live in a similar hell of the environment; the dream is afraid of others who expose their undercover identity. Both of them are trying to use their own hated identities to hide their real identity. Their position in tandem with their identity force them to be tortured all the time, which perfectly fits the Buddhist-influenced title.

See also

 Infernal Affairs film series
 Cinema of Hong Kong
 List of Hong Kong films
 Andy Lau filmography
 List of films featuring surveillance
 List of films set in Hong Kong

References

External links
 
 
 
 

2002 films
2002 action thriller films
2000s crime thriller films
Hong Kong New Wave films
Hong Kong action thriller films
Hong Kong crime thriller films
Hong Kong police films
2000s Cantonese-language films
Films directed by Andrew Lau
Best Film HKFA
Films set in Hong Kong
Films set in 2002
Films shot in Hong Kong
Films whose director won the Best Director Golden Horse Award
Police detective films
Triad films
Basic Pictures films
Media Asia films
Films directed by Alan Mak
Chinese New Year films
Fictional rivalries
2000s Hong Kong films